Karl Auer may refer to:

 Karl Auer (SS officer), Knight's Cross of the Iron Cross recipient
 Karl Auer (footballer) (1903–1945), German footballer